Colobothea macularis is a species of beetle in the family Cerambycidae. It was described by Olivier in 1792. It is known from Brazil, Ecuador, French Guiana, Peru, and Suriname.

References

macularis
Beetles described in 1792